SSRI is an acronym that stands for several things, including:

the class of antidepressants called selective serotonin reuptake inhibitor. (Cf. Reuptake enhancer)
the stock symbol for Silver Standard Resources Inc.
Social Security Retirement Income in the United States
Soviet Socialist Republic of Iran, aka the Persian Socialist Soviet Republic
the Steinhardt Social Research Institute at Brandeis University
the acronym of the Soviet Union in Uzbek (Sovet Sotsialistik Respublikalari Ittifoqi)